The year 1969 in film involved some significant events, with Butch Cassidy and the Sundance Kid dominating the U.S. box office and becoming one of the highest-grossing films of all time and Midnight Cowboy, a film rated X, winning the Academy Award for Best Picture.

Top-grossing films (U.S.)

The top ten 1969 released films by box office gross in North America are as follows:

Events
 January 14 - Louis F. Polk Jr. becomes president and CEO of Metro-Goldwyn-Mayer
February 23 - Madhubala dies due to a congenital heart disease, at age 36.
 June 22 - American singer and actress Judy Garland dies at age 47 of an accidental barbiturate overdose in London.
 July 8 - Kinney National Services Inc. acquire substantially all of the assets of Warner Bros.-Seven Arts.
 July 13 - Al Pacino's film debut (Me, Natalie).
 Summer - Last year for prize giving at the Venice Film Festival until it is revived in 1980. From 1969 to 1979, the festival is non-competitive.
 August 8 - Kirk Kerkorian buys 24% of Metro-Goldwyn-Mayer, becoming the biggest shareholder.
 August 9 - Tate murders: Sharon Tate, the 26-year-old actress, model and Roman Polanski's wife, is murdered by Charles Manson's "Family" at 10050 Cielo Drive in Beverly Hills, California.
 September 20 - Injun Trouble was released, becoming the final entry of Merrie Melodies before Warner Bros.-Seven Arts Animation was shut down.
 November 10 - Elvis Presley's film career ends with the release of Change of Habit.
 Jack and Jill: A Postscript becomes the first feature film to receive an Australian Film Institute Award.

Awards 

Palme d'Or (Cannes Film Festival):
If...., directed by Lindsay Anderson, United Kingdom

Golden Bear (Berlin Film Festival):
Rani Radovi (Early Works), directed by Želimir Žilnik, Yugoslavia

Films released in 1969
Note: U.S. releases unless stated.

January–March
January 1969
January 15
More Dead Than Alive
Riot
January 23
Dillinger Is Dead (Italy)
Some Girls Do
January 24
Before Winter Comes
January 27
The Extraordinary Seaman
February 1969
February 5
The Wrecking Crew
February 9
A Midsummer Night's Dream
February 12
The Candy Man
February 19
The Night of the Following Day
February 26
Z
March 1969
March 2
The Prime of Miss Jean Brodie
March 5
The Big Bounce
March 7
The Brain
March 10
The Assassination Bureau (U.K.)
Oh! What a Lovely War
March 11
2000 Years Later
March 12
Where Eagles Dare
March 13
Charro!
The Love Bug
March 21
Gamera vs. Guiron (Japan)
March 26
100 Rifles
The Illustrated Man
Support Your Local Sheriff!
March 27
Age of Consent

April–June
April 1969
April 1
Model Shop
Sam Whiskey
Sweet Charity
April 2
Angel in My Pocket
April 3
Goodbye, Columbus
April 9
The Wedding Party
April 16
Hook, Line & Sinker
April 17
Salesman
April 24
If It's Tuesday, This Must Be Belgium
April 30
The Big Cube
Hard Contract
Midas Run
May 1969
May 1
The Mad Room
May 6
Slaves
May 7
Sinful Davey
Where It's At
May 10
Mackenna's Gold
May 14
 Krakatoa, East of Java
 Nightmare in Wax
May 15
Midas Run
May 22
Frankenstein Must Be Destroyed (U.K.)
Winning
May 25
Midnight Cowboy
May 27
Popi
May 28
The April Fools
Guns of the Magnificent Seven
May 29
Carry On Camping
Che!
June 1969
June 5
The Italian Job
June 8
That Cold Day in the Park
June 11
The First Time
Rascal
June 12
Blue Movie
June 13
True Grit
June 18
Eye of the Cat
Mississippi Mermaid (France)
Ring of Bright Water
The Wild Bunch
June 19
The Bed Sitting Room
Last Summer
June 24
Chastity
June 25
The Bridge at Remagen 
The Chairman 
Hello Down There
My Side of the Mountain

July–September
July 1969
July 2
Three Into Two Won't Go
July 7
How to Commit Marriage
July 10
Putney Swope
July 11
The Lost Man
July 13
Dance of Death
Me, Natalie
July 14
Alfred the Great
Easy Rider
The Haunted House of Horror
July 18
The Appointment
July 19
The Mighty Gorga
July 20
Guns in the Heather'
July 23Castle KeepJuly 26Boy (Japan)Latitude Zero (Japan)
August 1969
August 6The Learning TreeAugust 9The Love God?More (France/West Germany)
August 18Take the Money and RunAugust 19Alice's RestaurantVenus in FursAugust 20StaircaseWhat Ever Happened to Aunt Alice?August 21Number OneAugust 27Medium CoolThe Rain PeopleAugust 28The Gypsy MothsSeptember 1969
September 3The Trouble with GirlsThe Valley of GwangiSeptember 5The BushbabySeptember 12Army of Shadows (France)
September 15Battle of BritainSeptember 17Bob & Carol & Ted & AliceSeptember 24Asterix and CleopatraSeptember 29De SadeOctober–December
October 1969
October 4Hail, Hero!October 5A Walk with Love and DeathOctober 6The Royal Hunt of the SunOctober 8The Good Guys and the Bad GuysThe MonitorsOctober 10Psycho (re-issue)
October 12The Madwoman of ChaillotOctober 14The Damned (Italy/West Germany)
October 15Eros + Massacre (Japan)Paint Your WagonThe Virgin SoldiersOctober 21Lock Up Your DaughtersOctober 22MarloweThe Sterile CuckooOctober 24Butch Cassidy and the Sundance KidOctober 29The Secret of Santa VittoriaNovember 1969
November 6Downhill RacerTrilogyNovember 10Change of HabitFlareupMaroonedThe Passion of Anna (Sweden)
November 11Don't Drink the WaterNovember 13Women in LoveNovember 15Goodbye, Mr. ChipsKesNovember 18The ArrangementThe Girl Who Knew Too MuchNovember 19The ComicNovember 26Angel, Angel, Down We GoNovember 27The UndefeatedDecember 1969
December 4A Boy Named Charlie BrownDecember 8The Sicilian Clan (France)
December 10They Shoot Horses, Don't They?December 12The Magic ChristianDecember 14John and MaryDecember 15GenerationDecember 16Cactus FlowerGaily, GailyHello, Dolly!December 18Anne of the Thousand Days On Her Majesty's Secret Service Tell Them Willie Boy Is HereDecember 19Captain Nemo and the Underwater CityTopazDecember 20All Monsters Attack (Japan)
December 21Burn!HamletThe Happy EndingDecember 24The Computer Wore Tennis ShoesDecember 25The ReiversNotable films released in 1969
Note: U.S. releases unless stated.

#100 Rifles, starring Jim Brown, Raquel Welch, Burt Reynolds

AÅdalen 31, directed by Bo Widerberg – (Sweden)Adelheid, directed by František Vláčil – (Czechoslovakia)The Adjutant of His Excellency (Adyutant ego prevoskhoditelstva) – (U.S.S.R.)Age of Consent, directed by Michael Powell, starring James Mason and Helen Mirren – (Australia)Alfred the Great, starring David Hemmings – (U.K.)Alice's Restaurant, directed by Arthur Penn, starring Arlo GuthrieAll Monsters Attack (Gojira Minira Gabara Ōru Kaijū Daishingeki, also known as Godzilla's Revenge), directed by Ishirō Honda – (Japan)All My Compatriots (Všichni dobří rodáci) – (Czechoslovakia)Angel in My Pocket, starring Andy GriffithAnne of the Thousand Days, starring Richard Burton, Geneviève Bujold, John Colicos, Anthony Quayle – winner of 4 Golden Globes – (U.K.)The April Fools, starring Jack Lemmon, Catherine Deneuve, Peter LawfordAradhana (Worship) – (India)Army of Shadows (L'armée des ombres), directed by Jean-Pierre Melville, starring Lino Ventura and Simone Signoret – (France)The Arrangement, directed by Elia Kazan, starring Kirk Douglas and Deborah KerrArthur? Arthur!, starring Shelley Winters, Terry-Thomas, Tammy GrimesThe Assassination Bureau, directed by Basil Dearden, starring Oliver Reed, Diana Rigg, Telly Savalas – (U.K.)

BBallad of Carl-Henning (Balladen om Carl-Henning) – (Denmark)Bambi Meets Godzilla, very short cult film by Marv NewlandBattle of Britain, starring Laurence Olivier, Trevor Howard, Michael Caine, Christopher Plummer – (U.K.)Battle of Neretva (Bitka na Neretvi), starring Sergei Bondarchuk and Yul Brynner – (Yugoslavia)The Bed-Sitting Room, directed by Richard Lester, starring Rita Tushingham, Ralph Richardson, Marty Feldman – (U.K.)Before Winter Comes, starring David Niven – (U.K.)The Big Bounce, starring Ryan O'Neal and Leigh Taylor-YoungBlue Movie, directed by Andy WarholBob & Carol & Ted & Alice, directed by Paul Mazursky, starring Natalie Wood, Robert Culp, Elliott Gould, Dyan CannonBoy (Shonen), directed by Nagisa Oshima – (Japan)A Boy Named Charlie BrownThe Brain (Le Cerveau), starring Jean-Paul Belmondo, Bourvil, David Niven – (France/Italy)The Bridge at Remagen, starring George Segal, Ben Gazzara, Bradford Dillman, Robert VaughnThe Brothers Karamazov (Bratya Karamazovy) – (U.S.S.R.)Burn! (Queimada), directed by Gillo Pontecorvo, starring Marlon Brando – (Italy)The Bushbaby, directed by John Trent and starring Margaret Brooks and Lou GossettButch Cassidy and the Sundance Kid, directed by George Roy Hill, starring Paul Newman, Robert Redford, Katharine Ross

CCactus Flower, starring Walter Matthau, Ingrid Bergman, Goldie HawnCan Heironymus Merkin Ever Forget Mercy Humppe and Find True Happiness?, starring Anthony Newley and Joan CollinsCaptain Nemo and the Underwater City, starring Robert Ryan and Chuck ConnorsCarry On Camping, starring Sid James, Kenneth Williams, Barbara Windsor – (U.K.)Castle Keep, directed by Sydney Pollack, starring Burt Lancaster, Patrick O'Neal, Peter FalkThe Chairman, starring Gregory PeckChange of Habit, starring Elvis Presley, Mary Tyler Moore, Edward AsnerChastity, starring CherChe!, directed by Richard Fleischer, starring Omar Sharif and Jack PalanceThe Color of Pomegranates (Nran guyne) – (U.S.S.R.)The Comic, directed by Carl Reiner, starring Dick Van DykeIl Commissario Pepe (Police Chief pepe), starring Ugo Tognazzi – (Italy)The Computer Wore Tennis Shoes, starring Kurt RussellThe Cremator (Spalovač mrtvol) – (Czechoslovakia)

DThe Damned (La caduta degli dei), directed by Luchino Visconti, starring Dirk Bogarde and Ingrid Thulin – (Italy/West Germany)Daughter of the Mind, starring Don Murray and Ray MillandDe Sade, starring Keir Dullea, Senta Berger, John Huston – (U.S./West Germany)Death of a Gunfighter, starring Richard Widmark and Lena HorneDillinger Is Dead (Dillinger è morto), starring Michel Piccoli and Anita Pallenberg – (Italy)Don't Drink the Water, directed by Howard Morris, written by Woody Allen, starring Jackie Gleason, Estelle Parsons, Ted Bessell, Michael ConstantineDo Raaste (Two Roads) – (India)Doppelgänger, starring Roy Thinnes, Lynn Loring, Herbert LomDouble Suicide (Shinjū: Ten no amijima) – (Japan)Downhill Racer, starring Robert Redford, Gene Hackman, Camilla SparvThe Dragon of Evil Against the Warrior Saint (O Dragão da Maldade Contra o Santo Guerreiro), directed by Glauber Rocha – (Brazil)

EEasy Rider, directed by and starring Dennis Hopper, with Peter Fonda and Jack NicholsonEnd of a Priest (Farářův konec) – (Czechoslovakia)Eros Plus Massacre (Erosu purasu gyakusatsu) – (Japan)Everything for Sale (Wszystko na sprzedaż), written and directed by Andrzej Wajda – (Poland)The Exquisite Cadaver (Las crueles), starring Capucine – (Spain)The Extraordinary Seaman, directed by John Frankenheimer, starring David Niven, Faye Dunaway, Alan AldaEye of the Cat, starring Michael Sarrazin, Gayle Hunnicutt, Eleanor Parker

FFellini Satyricon, directed by Federico Fellini – (Italy)Flashback, directed by Raffaele Andreassi – (Italy)Frankenstein Must Be Destroyed, directed by Terence Fisher, starring Peter Cushing – (U.K.)Fraulein Doktor, starring Suzy Kendall, Kenneth More, CapucineFuneral Parade of Roses (Bara no Sōretsu), by Toshio Matsumoto – (Japan)

GGaily, Gaily, directed by Norman Jewison, starring Beau Bridges, Melina Mercouri, George Kennedy, Margot KidderA Gentle Woman (Une femme douce), directed by Robert Bresson, starring Dominique Sanda – (France)The Girl from Rio, starring Shirley Eaton, Richard Wyler and George Sanders – (Spain/West Germany/U.S.)Goodbye, Columbus, starring Richard Benjamin, Ali MacGraw and Jack KlugmanGoodbye, Mr. Chips, directed by Herbert Ross, starring Peter O'Toole and Petula ClarkGood Morning, My Dear Wife, starring Salah Zulfikar and Nelly – (Egypt)Goyokin, directed by Hideo Gosha – (Japan)The Grasshopper, directed by Jerry Paris, starring Jacqueline Bisset and Jim BrownThe Great Love (Le grand amour) – (France)Guns of the Magnificent Seven, directed by Paul Wendkos, starring George Kennedy and James WhitmoreThe Gypsy Moths, directed by John Frankenheimer, starring Burt Lancaster, Deborah Kerr, Gene Hackman, Bonnie Bedelia

HHail, Hero! directed by David Miller Starring Michael Douglas and Peter Strauss.Hamlet, directed by Tony Richardson, starring Nicol Williamson, Marianne Faithfull, Anthony Hopkins – (U.K.)Handcuffs (Lisice) – (Yugoslavia)Hannibal Brooks, starring Oliver ReedThe Happy Ending, starring Jean Simmons, John Forsythe, Shirley Jones, Lloyd Bridges and Teresa WrightHard Contract, starring James Coburn, Lee Remick, Burgess Meredith – (U.K.)The Haunted House of Horror (a.k.a. Horror House or The Dark), starring Frankie Avalon and Jill Haworth – (U.K.)Hello, Dolly!, directed by Gene Kelly, starring Barbra Streisand, Walter Matthau, Michael Crawford, Tommy Tune, Louis ArmstrongHello Down There, starring Tony Randall, Janet Leigh, Jim Backus, Charlotte Rae, Ken Berry, Roddy McDowall, Richard DreyfussHoneycomb (La madriguera), directed by Carlos Saura, starring Geraldine Chaplin – (Spain)The Honeymoon Killers, starring Tony LoBianco and Shirley StolerHook, Line & Sinker, starring Jerry Lewis and Peter LawfordHow to Commit Marriage, starring Bob Hope, Jackie Gleason, Jane Wyman, Tina Louise, Maureen Arthur, Leslie NielsenHeaven Is Never a Great Distance, starring Mohammad Ali Fardin – Iran

IIf It's Tuesday, This Must Be Belgium, starring Suzanne Pleshette, Ian McShane, Michael ConstantineI'm an Elephant, Madame (Ich bin ein Elefant, Madame) – (West Germany)The Italian Job, directed by Peter Collinson, starring Michael Caine and Noël Coward – (U.K.)The Illustrated Man, starring Rod Steiger and Claire BloomIt's Tough Being a Man (Otoko wa tsurai yo) – (Japan)Ittefaq, starring Rajesh Khanna – (India)

JJackal of Nahueltoro (El Chacal de Nahueltoro) – (Chile)John and Mary, starring Dustin Hoffman and Mia Farrow

KKatrina – (South Africa)Katzelmacher, directed by and starring Rainer Werner Fassbinder with Hanna Schygulla – (West Germany)Kes, directed by Ken Loach – (U.K.)Khamoshi (Silence) – (India)

LL'amour fou, directed by Jacques Rivette – (France)The Land (Al-ard), directed by Youssef Chahine – (Egypt)Larks on a String (Skřivánci na niti), directed by Jiří Menzel – (Czechoslovakia) – banned until 1990Last Summer, starring Barbara Hershey, Richard Thomas, Bruce Davison, Catherine BurnsLaughter in the Dark (La Chambre obscure), directed by Tony Richardson, starring Nicol Williamson and Anna Karina – (France/U.K.)The Learning Tree, directed by Gordon ParksLions Love, directed by Agnès VardaLock Up Your Daughters, starring Christopher Plummer, Susannah York, Glynis JohnsLost Flight, starring Anne Francis, Lloyd Bridges, Billy Dee WilliamsThe Lost Man, starring Sidney Poitier and Joanna ShimkusThe Love God?, directed by Nat Hiken, starring Don Knotts, Anne Francis, Maureen ArthurLove Is Colder Than Death (Liebe ist kälter als der Tod), directed by Rainer Werner Fassbinder – (West Germany)

MMachine Gun McCain, starring John Cassavetes and Peter FalkMackenna's Gold, starring Gregory Peck, Telly Savalas, Camilla Sparv, and Omar SharifMacunaíma, directed by Joaquim Pedro de Andrade – (Brazil)The Madwoman of Chaillot, starring Katharine Hepburn, Paul Henreid, Yul Brynner, Charles Boyer, John Gavin, Danny KayeThe Magic Christian, starring Peter Sellers, Ringo Starr, Raquel Welch – (U.K.)Marlowe, directed by Paul Bogart, starring James Garner, Gayle Hunnicutt, Rita Moreno, Carroll O'Connor, Bruce LeeMarooned, directed by John Sturges, starring Gregory Peck, David Janssen, Richard Crenna, James Franciscus, Gene HackmanMarquis de Sade: Justine, starring Romina Power, Klaus Kinski, Jack Palance – (Italy)Medea, directed by Pier Paolo Pasolini, starring Maria Callas – (Italy/France/West Germany)Medium Cool, directed by Haskell Wexler, starring Robert Forster, Marianna Hill, Peter BonerzMidas Run, starring Richard Crenna, Anne Heywood, Fred AstaireMidnight Cowboy, directed by John Schlesinger, screenplay by Waldo Salt, starring Jon Voight and Dustin HoffmanThe Milky Way (La voie lactée), directed by Luis Buñuel – (France/Italy/West Germany)Mississippi Mermaid (La sirène du ), directed by François Truffaut, starring Catherine Deneuve and Jean-Paul Belmondo – (France)The Monitors, starring Guy Stockwell and Susan OliverMon oncle Benjamin (My Uncle Benjamin) – (France)Monsieur Hawarden – (Belgium/Netherlands)Monte Carlo or Bust!, aka Those Daring Young Men in Their Jaunty Jalopies, starring Tony Curtis, Peter Sellers, Dudley Moore – (U.K./France/Italy)More, directed by Barbet Schroeder, starring Mimsy Farmer and Klaus Grünberg – (France/West Germany)More Dead Than Alive, starring Clint Walker and Anne FrancisMosquito Squadron, starring David McCallum – (U.K.)My Night at Maud's (Ma nuit chez Maud), directed by Éric Rohmer – (France)

NThe Night of Counting the Years (Al-Mummia) – (Egypt) Nightmare in Wax, starring Cameron Mitchell and Anne HelmNumber One, starring Charlton Heston, Jessica Walter, Bruce Dern

OThe Oblong Box, starring Vincent Price and Christopher LeeOh! What a Lovely War, directed by Richard Attenborough, starring Laurence Olivier, Ralph Richardson, John Mills – (U.K.)On Her Majesty's Secret Service, starring George Lazenby (as James Bond), with Diana Rigg and Telly Savalas – (U.K.)

PPaint Your Wagon, directed by Joshua Logan, starring Lee Marvin, Clint Eastwood, Jean Seberg, with songs by Lerner and LoeweThe Passion of Anna, directed by Ingmar Bergman, starring Max von Sydow, Liv Ullmann, Bibi Andersson – (Sweden)Pigsty (Porcile), directed by Pier Paolo Pasolini – (Italy)La Piscine (The Swimming Pool), starring Alain Delon and Romy Schneider – (France)Play Dirty, starring Michael Caine – (U.K.)Popi, directed by Arthur Hiller, starring Alan Arkin and Rita MorenoThe Prime of Miss Jean Brodie, directed by Ronald Neame, starring Maggie Smith (Academy Award winner) – (U.K.)The Promise, starring John Castle and Ian McKellen – (U.K.)Putney Swope, directed by Robert Downey, Sr.

QA Quiet Place in the Country (Un tranquillo posto di campagna), starring Franco Nero and Vanessa Redgrave – (Italy/France)

RThe Rain People, directed by Francis Ford Coppola, starring James Caan, Robert Duvall, Shirley KnightRani Radovi (Early Years) – Golden Bear winner – (Yugoslavia)Rascal, starring Bill Mumy and Steve ForrestThe Red Tent (Krasnaya palatka) – (U.S.S.R./Italy/U.K.)The Reivers, based on the novel by William Faulkner, directed by Mark Rydell, starring Steve McQueen, Rupert Crosse, Sharon Farrell, Mitch Vogel, Will Geer, narrated by Burgess MeredithLa residencia (The Boarding School), starring Lilli Palmer – (Spain)Rider on the Rain (Le Passager de la pluie), directed by René Clément, starring Charles Bronson and Marlène Jobert – (France)Ring of Bright Water, starring Bill Travers and Virginia McKenna – (U.K.)Riot, starring Jim Brown and Gene HackmanThe Royal Hunt of the Sun, starring Robert Shaw and Christopher Plummer – (U.K./U.S.)

SSabata, starring Lee Van Cleef – (Italy)Salesman, directed by Albert and David Maysles and Charlotte ZwerinSam Whiskey, starring Burt Reynolds and Angie DickinsonSatyakam, starring Dharmendra and Ashok Kumar – (India)The Secret of Santa Vittoria, directed by Stanley Kramer, starring Anthony Quinn and Anna MagnaniShining Star, starring Ahmad Ghadakchian and Forouzan – (Iran)Shinsengumi, starring Toshiro Mifune – (Japan)The Sicilian Clan (Le clan des siciliens), starring Jean Gabin, Alain Delon and Lino Ventura – (France)Sinful Davey, directed by John Huston, starring John HurtSlaves, directed by Herbert Biberman, starring Dionne Warwick, Ossie Davis and Stephen BoydSome Girls Do, starring Richard Johnson and Daliah LaviSome Kind of a Nut, starring Dick Van Dyke, Rosemary Forsyth and Angie DickinsonThe Southern Star, starring George Segal, Orson Welles and Ursula AndressStaircase, directed by Stanley Donen, starring Rex Harrison and Richard BurtonThe Sterile Cuckoo, starring Liza MinnelliStiletto, starring Alex Cord, Britt Ekland, Joseph Wiseman and Patrick O'NealSupport Your Local Sheriff!, starring James Garner, Joan Hackett, Walter Brennan, Harry Morgan and Jack ElamSweet Charity, directed by Bob Fosse, starring Shirley MacLaine

TTake the Money and Run, directed by and starring Woody Allen, with Janet Margolin and Louise LasserA Talent for Loving, directed by Richard Quine, starring Richard Widmark, Cesar Romero, Topol, Fran JeffriesThey Shoot Horses, Don't They?, directed by Sydney Pollack, starring Jane Fonda, Gig Young, Michael Sarrazin, Red ButtonsTell Them Willie Boy Is Here, starring Robert Redford, Katharine Ross, Robert BlakeThe Great Bank RobberyThis Man Must Die (Que la bête meure), directed by Claude Chabrol – (France/Italy)Three Into Two Won't Go, starring Rod Steiger, Claire Bloom, Peggy AshcroftTill Death Us Do Part, starring Warren Mitchell and Dandy Nichols – (U.K.)A Time for Dying, starring Audie Murphy and Anne RandallTopaz, directed by Alfred Hitchcock, starring Frederick Stafford, John Forsythe, John Vernon, Roscoe Lee BrowneThe Trouble with Girls, directed by Peter Tewksbury, starring Elvis Presley, Vincent Price, Dabney Coleman, Sheree North, John Carradine, Susan OlsenTrue Grit, directed by Henry Hathaway, starring John Wayne, Kim Darby, Glen Campbell, Jeff Corey, Robert Duvall, Strother Martin, Dennis HopperTwinky, starring Charles Bronson and Susan George – (U.K.)

UUltraman, Ultraseven: Great Violent Monster Fight – (Japan)The Undefeated, starring John Wayne and Rock HudsonThe Unfaithful Wife (La Femme infidèle), directed by Claude Chabrol, starring Stéphane Audran – (France)

VThe Valley of Gwangi, starring James Franciscus, Gila Golan, Richard Carlson, with visual effects by Ray Harryhausen completing work by Willis O'BrienViimne reliikvia, directed by Grigori Kromanov (Estonian SSR, U.S.S.R.)Viva Max!, directed by Jerry Paris, starring Peter Ustinov, Pamela Tiffin, John Astin, Jonathan Winters

WThe Wedding Party, directed by Wilford Leach, Brian De Palma and Cynthia MonroeWhat Ever Happened to Aunt Alice?, starring Geraldine Page, Ruth Gordon and Rosemary ForsythWhat's Good for the Goose, starring Norman Wisdom and Sally Geeson – (U.K.)Where It's At, starring David Janssen and Rosemary ForsythWhere's Jack?, starring Stanley Baker and Tommy Steele – (U.K.)White Sun of the Desert (Beloye solntse pustyni), directed by Vladimir Motyl – (U.S.S.R.)The Wild Bunch, directed by Sam Peckinpah, starring William Holden, Robert Ryan, Ernest Borgnine, Edmond O'Brien, Ben Johnson and Warren OatesWinning, starring Paul Newman, Joanne Woodward, Richard Thomas, Robert WagnerThe Witness (A tanu), directed by Péter Bacsó – (Hungary)Women in Love, directed by Ken Russell, starring Alan Bates, Oliver Reed and Glenda Jackson – (U.K.)The Wonderful World of Puss 'n Boots (Nagagutsu o Haita Neko), directed by Kimio Yabuki – (Japan)The Wrecking Crew, starring Dean Martin, Elke Sommer, Nancy Kwan, Tina Louise and Sharon Tate

YYoung Billy Young, starring Robert Mitchum, Angie Dickinson, Robert Walker Jr.

ZZ, directed by Costa Gavras, starring Yves Montand and Irene Papas – (France/Algeria)

Short film seriesLooney Tunes (1930–1969)Merrie Melodies (1931–1969)
 Cool Cat (1967—1969)
 Merlin the Magic Mouse (1967—1969)The Pink Panther (1963–1969, 1971–1977, 1978–1980)The Inspector (1965-1969)The Ant and the Aardvark (1969–1971)Roland and Rattfink (1968–1971)Tijuana Toads (1969–1972)Woody Woodpecker (1941–1949, 1951–1972)Chilly Willy (1955–1972)The Beary Family (1962–1972)

Births
January 1
Mr. Lawrence, American voice actor, comedian, writer, storyboard artist, animator and director
Verne Troyer, American actor (died 2018)
January 2 - Nicholas Gleaves, English actor
January 5 - Shea Whigham, American actor
January 8 - Ami Dolenz, American former actress
January 14 – Jason Bateman, American actor
January 17 – James Waterston, American actor
January 18 – Dave Bautista, American actor and former professional wrestler
January 20 - Reno Wilson, American actor
January 21 - Matt Willig, American actor and former football player
January 22 - Olivia d'Abo, British actress and singer
January 27 – Patton Oswalt, American stand-up comedian, actor, voice actor, and writer
February 3 - Shane Rangi, New Zealand actor
February 4 - Brandy Ledford, American actress and model
February 5
Bobby Brown, American singer-songwriter and actor
Michael Sheen, Welsh actor and producer
February 6
April Haney, American former actress and singer
Masaharu Fukuyama, Japanese actor and singer
David Hayter, Canadian actor, screenwriter, director, and producer
February 8 
Brian Krause, American actor
Mary McCormack, American actress
February 11
Jennifer Aniston, American actress
Lee Tockar, Canadian voice actor and visual artist
February 12 - Darren Aronofsky, American director, producer and screenwriter
February 13 - Andrew Bryniarski, American actor
February 22 - Thomas Jane, American actor
February 28 - Robert Sean Leonard, American actor
March 1 – Javier Bardem, Spanish actor
March 8 - Don Hall (filmmaker), American director, voice actor and writer
March 10
Paget Brewster, American actress
Dave Sheridan (actor), American actor, comedian, writer, producer and musician
March 11 – Terrence Howard, American actor
March 15 - Kim Raver, American actress and producer
March 16 - Judah Friedlander, American actor and comedian
March 23 - Richard Cadell, Illusionist, puppeteer and screenwriter
March 27 - Kevin Corrigan, American character actor
March 28 - Brett Ratner, American director and producer
April 2 – Ajay Devgan, Indian actor
April 3 – Ben Mendelsohn, Australian actor
April 6 – Paul Rudd, American actor
April 21 – Toby Stephens, English actor
April 23 – Byron Thames, American actor
April 24 - Rory McCann, Scottish actor
April 25 – Renée Zellweger, American actress
May 1 – Wes Anderson, American director
May 2 - Karel Dobrý, Czech actor
May 10 - Lenny Venito, American actor
May 14 – Cate Blanchett, Australian actress
May 22 - Michael Kelly (actor), American actor
May 24 – Carl Anthony Payne II, American actor
May 25 – Anne Heche, American actress (died 2022)
June 1 – Teri Polo, American actress
June 4 - Horatio Sanz, Chilean-born American actor and comedian
June 6 - Nina Sosanya, English actress and narrator
June 7
Adam Buxton, English actor, comedian and writer
Kim Rhodes, American actress
Anthony Simcoe, Australian actor
June 8 - J. P. Manoux, American actor, director and writer
June 9 - Josh Hamilton (actor), American actor
June 11 – Peter Dinklage, American actor
June 15 – Ice Cube, American actor and rapper
June 18 - Ella Kenion, English comedy actress
June 23 - Martin Klebba, American character actor and stunt performer
June 24 - Jensen Daggett, American actress
June 28
Tichina Arnold, American actress
Angeline Ball, Irish actress
Ayelet Zurer, Israeli actress
June 29 - Aleks Paunovic, Canadian actor
July 5 - RZA, American rapper, actor and filmmaker
July 6 - Brian Van Holt, American actor
July 7 - Cree Summer, American-Canadian actress, voice actress and singer
July 10 - Jamie Glover, English actor
July 13 - Ken Jeong, American stand-up comedian, actor and producer
July 17
Jason Clarke, Australian actor
Kazuki Kitamura, Japanese actor
July 19 - Bodhi Elfman, American actor
July 21 – Godfrey, American actor, comedian
July 22 – James Arnold Taylor, American actor, writer and producer
July 24
Rick Fox, Canadian-Bahamian former basketball player and actor
Jennifer Lopez, American actress, singer
July 25 - Dave B. Mitchell, American voice actor
July 28
Alexis Arquette, American actress (died 2016)
Noma Dumezweni, British actress
August 4 – Vlad Ivanov, Romanian actor
August 5
Chuck Campbell, Canadian actor and comedian
Kim Mai Guest, American voice actress
August 6 - Chris Edgerly, American voice actor, comedian and singer
August 8 - Chris Beetem, American actor
August 15 - Kimberley Kates, American actress and producer
August 16 - Kate Higgins, American voice actress and singer
August 17 - Donnie Wahlberg, American singer, songwriter, rapper, actor and producer
August 18
 Edward Norton, American actor
 Christian Slater, American actor
August 19 – Matthew Perry, Canadian-American actor
August 21 - Nathan Jones (wrestler), Australian actor and former professional wrestler
August 24 - Pierfrancesco Favino, Italian actor and producer
August 27 - Reece Shearsmith, English actor, writer and comedian
August 28 – Jack Black, American actor, comedian, musician
September 4 - Noah Taylor, Australian actor
September 7 - Angie Everhart, American actress
September 13 – Tyler Perry, American actor
September 14
Bong Joon-ho, Korean director and screenwriter
Oscar Kightley, Samoan-born New Zealand actor, television presenter, writer, director and comedian
September 22 - Sue Perkins, English actress, broadcaster, comedian, presenter and writer
September 23 - Crispin Bonham-Carter, English actor
September 25 – Catherine Zeta-Jones, Welsh actress
September 26 - David Slade, British director and actor
September 29 – Erika Eleniak, American actress
September 30
Silas Weir Mitchell (actor), American character actor
Mark Smith (actor), British actor
October 1 – Zach Galifianakis, American actor
October 4 - Abraham Benrubi, American actor
October 8
Jeremy Davies, American actor
Dylan Neal, Canadian-American actor
October 9 – Steve McQueen, English director
October 15 – Dominic West, English actor
October 17
Wood Harris, American actor
Nancy Sullivan, American actress, television presenter, and screenwriter
October 19
Roger Cross, Jamaican-born Canadian actor
Trey Parker, American actor, creator of South ParkOctober 25 - Nika Futterman, American actress, voice actress and singer
October 26 - Robert Maillet, Canadian actor and former professional wrestler
November 4 – Matthew McConaughey, American actor
November 10 - Jennifer Cody, American dancer and actress
November 13 – Gerard Butler, Scottish actor
November 27 - Chin Han (actor, born 1969), Singaporean actor
November 28 - Martin Cummins, Canadian actor
November 30
Marc Forster, German-Swiss director, producer and screenwriter
Chris Weitz, American director, screenwriter and producer
December 5 - Eric Etebari, Iranian-American actor
Catherine Tate, English actress, comedian and writer
December 7 - Patrice O'Neal, American stand-up comedian, actor and radio personality (died 2011)
December 9 - Allison Smith (actress), American actress, singer, writer and director
December 10 - Stephen Billington, English actor
December 11 - Max Martini, American actor, writer and director
December 13 - Tony Curran, Scottish actor
December 14 - Natascha McElhone, English actress
December 15 - Ralph Ineson, English actor and narrator
December 19 – Kristy Swanson, American actress
December 21 – Julie Delpy, French actress
December 27 - Sarah Vowell, American actress
December 29 - Jennifer Ehle, American actress

Deaths
January 1 – Barton MacLane, 66, American actor, The Maltese Falcon, The Treasure of the Sierra MadreJanuary 3 – Howard McNear, 63, American actor, Anatomy of a Murder, Voyage to the Bottom of the Sea, Blue Hawaii, Follow That DreamRecord of Howard T. McNear. Ancestry.com. California Death Index, 1940-1997 [database on-line]. Provo, UT, US: The Generations Network, Inc., 2000.
January 4 – Violet and Daisy Hilton, 60, English conjoined twins, actresses, appeared in film FreaksJanuary 8 – Leslie Goodwins, 69, English director, The Mummy's Curse, Mexican SpitfireJanuary 27 – Charles Winninger, 84, American actor, Destry Rides Again, The Sun Shines BrightFebruary 2 – Boris Karloff, 81, English actor, Dr. Seuss' How the Grinch Stole Christmas!, Frankenstein, The Mummy, The RavenFebruary 5 – Thelma Ritter, 66, American actress, Rear Window, All About EveFebruary 9 – Gabby Hayes, 83, American actor, The Man from Utah, In Old OklahomaFebruary 11 – James Lanphier, 48, American actor, The Pink Panther, The PartyFebruary 19 - Madge Blake, 69, American actress, The Long, Long Trailer, BatmanFebruary 23 - Madhubala, 36, Indian actress, Mahal, Chalti Ka Naam Gaadi, Mughal-E-Azam 
February 27 – John Boles, 73, American actor, Frankenstein, Stella DallasMarch 18 – Barbara Bates, 43, American actress, The Caddy, All About EveMarch 19 – Lola Braccini, 79, Italian actress, My Little One, What a Distinguished FamilyMarch 25 – Alan Mowbray, 72, British actor, Terror by Night, My Darling ClementineApril 2 – Fortunio Bonanova, 74, Spanish actor, Citizen Kane, An Affair to Remember 
April 23 – Krzysztof Komeda, 37, Polish composer, Rosemary's Baby, The Fearless Vampire KillersMay 3 – Karl Freund, 69, Czech-American cinematographer and director, Metropolis, The Mummy, Key LargoMay 24
Paul Birch, 57, American actor, The Gun Runners, Gunmen from LaredoMitzi Green, 48, American actress, Lost in Alaska, SkippyMay 27 – Jeffrey Hunter, 42, American actor, The Searchers, King of KingsJune 2 – Leo Gorcey, 51, American actor, Ghost Chasers, Spook BustersJune 8 – Robert Taylor, 57, American actor, Quo Vadis, Camille, Bataan, IvanhoeJune 10 – Frank Lawton, 64, English actor, A Night to Remember, The Devil-DollJune 13 – Martita Hunt, 70, Argentine-English actress, Becket, Great ExpectationsJune 19 – Natalie Talmadge, 73, American silent screen actress, Our Hospitality, IntoleranceJune 20 – Rudolf Schwarzkogler, 29, Austrian experimental filmmaker, SatisfactionJune 22 – Judy Garland, 47, American actress and singer, The Wizard of Oz, Meet Me in St. Louis, A Star Is BornJune 23 – Stanley Andrews, 77, American actor, West of Wyoming, Across the Badlands, Canadian Mounties vs. Atomic InvadersJuly 5 - Lambert Hillyer, 75, American director, Dracula's Daughter, BatmanJuly 5 – Leo McCarey, 72, American director, An Affair to Remember, Going My WayJuly 7 - Erskine Sanford, 83, American actor, Citizen Kane, The Magnificent AmbersonsJuly 8 – Gladys Swarthout, 68, American singer, Romance in the Dark, Give Us This NightJuly 13 - Bess Meredyth, 79, American screenwriter, The Unsuspected, Charlie Chan at the Opera 
July 15 - Peter van Eyck, 57, Polish actor, The Wages of Fear, The Spy Who Came in from the ColdJuly 17 - Harry Benham, 85, American actor, Nicholas NicklebyJuly 18 - Barbara Pepper, 54, American actress, The Rogues Tavern, Kiss Me, StupidJuly 26 – Raymond Walburn, 81, American actor, High, Wide, and Handsome, Third Finger, Left Hand 
August 1 – Donald Keith, 65, American actor, The Plastic Age, Parisian LoveAugust 9 – Sharon Tate, 26, American actress, The Fearless Vampire Killers, Valley of the DollsAugust 14 – Sigrid Gurie, 58, American actress, Algiers, The Adventures of Marco PoloAugust 15 – William Goetz, 66, American producer, studio executive, Sayonara, Les MisérablesAugust 18 – Mildred Davis, 68, American actress, Safety Last!, Grandma’s Boy
August 26 – Martin Miller, 69, Czech actor, 55 Days at Peking, The Pink PantherSeptember 14 – James Anderson, 48, American actor, To Kill a Mockingbird, Take the Money and RunSeptember 19 – Rex Ingram, 73, American actor, The Adventures of Huckleberry Finn, The Thief of BagdadOctober 8 – Eduardo Ciannelli, 81, Italian actor, Gunga Din, Strange CargoOctober 12 – Sonja Henie, 57, Norwegian actress, former Olympic ice skater, Sun Valley Serenade, One in a MillionOctober 15 – Rod La Rocque, 70, American actor, Meet John Doe, The Shadow StrikesOctober 28 – Constance Dowling, 49, American actress, Up in Arms, The Well-Groomed BrideNovember 5 – Lloyd Corrigan, 69, American actor, Son of Paleface, The Thin Man Goes HomeNovember 8 – Dave O'Brien, 57, American actor, Captain Midnight, Brand of the DevilDecember 3 – Ruth White, 55, American actress, To Kill a Mockingbird, No Way to Treat a LadyDecember 7 – Eric Portman, 68, British actor, A Canterbury Tale, The Bedford IncidentDecember 13 – Luigi Pavese, 72, Italian actor, Toto in Color, Il MattatoreDecember 22 
Ilse Steppat, 52, German actress, On Her Majesty's Secret ServiceJosef von Sternberg, 73, Austrian director, The Blue Angel, MacaoFilm debuts
Amitabh Bachchan – Saat HindustaniBob Balaban – Midnight CowboyBonnie Bedelia – The Gypsy MothsEd Begley Jr. – The Computer Wore Tennis ShoesDavid Bowie – The Virgin SoldiersBernie Casey – Guns of the Magnificent SevenGraham Chapman – The Magic ChristianJill Clayburgh – The Wedding PartyJames Cosmo – Battle of BritainBruce Davison – Last SummerLesley-Anne Down – The Smashing Bird I Used to KnowSam Elliott – Butch Cassidy and the Sundance KidFarrah Fawcett – Love Is a Funny ThingBridget Fonda – Easy RiderMelanie Griffith – Smith!Anjelica Huston – A Walk with Love and DeathRaul Julia – StilettoK.P.A.C Lalitha – Kootu KudumbamGeorge Lazenby – On Her Majesty's Secret ServiceJoanna Lumley – Some Girls DoMiriam Margoyles – A Nice Girl Like MeIan McKellen – A Touch of LoveRyan O'Neal – The Big BounceAl Pacino – Me, NatalieRon Rifkin – The Devil's 8Sydne Rome – Some Girls DoJohn Savage – The Master BeaterArnold Schwarzenegger – Hercules in New YorkJane Seymour – Oh! What a Lovely WarSylvester Stallone – The Square RootChristopher Walken – Me and My BrotherM. Emmet Walsh – Midnight CowboyRay Wise – Dare the Devil''

References 

 
Film by year